St. Birgitta's Church is a wooden church in the city of Nykarleby, Ostrobothnia, Finland. It was built in 1708. Nowadays it is one of the biggest attractions in the city. The ceiling paintings in the church were designed by Daniel Hjulström and Johan Alm and date back to the 18th century. 

Wooden churches in Finland
Nykarleby
Buildings and structures in Ostrobothnia (region)
Tourist attractions in Ostrobothnia (region)
Churches completed in 1708
1708 establishments in Sweden
Lutheran churches in Finland